Leo Boyce McLeay (born 4 October 1945) is a former Australian politician who served as a Labor Party member of the House of Representatives from June 1979 to October 2004.  He was Speaker of the House of Representatives 1989–93. During 1992 he was unsuccessfully censured by John Hewson, at the time Opposition Leader, with a motion of no confidence; Hewson accused McLeay of political bias.

Early life
McLeay was born on 4 October 1945 in Marrickville, New South Wales. He was the older of two children born to Joan Ann and Ronald Boyce McLeay. His father was a council worker and worked on the construction of the Sydney Harbour Bridge.

McLeay attended De La Salle College, Marrickville. He left school before obtaining a leaving certificate and began working as a post office telegram boy. In 1962 he joined the Postmaster-General's Department as a telephone technician, receiving further training at North Sydney Technical College. He was a member of the Postal Telecommunication Technicians' Association and the Federated Clerks' Union.

Early political involvement
McLeay joined the ALP at the age of 13 and was state secretary of Young Labor in 1969. He served on the Marrickville Municipal Council from 1971 to 1977. He became a paid ALP employee with the support of Graham Richardson, initially as an organiser and then as assistant general secretary of the state branch from 1976 to 1979.

Politics
McLeay was elected to federal parliament at the 1979 Grayndler by-election, following the death in office of Frank Stewart. He joined a number of parliamentary committees and in 1982 chaired the subcommittee that delivered the In a Home or at Home report on aged care. He was elected chairman of committees in 1986, serving as deputy to Joan Child, and was elected as her replacement upon her retirement in 1989.

McLeay represented the Division of Grayndler from 1979 until 1993. In 1993, the Division of Phillip was due to be abolished, and its sitting member Jeannette McHugh had become a minister and was entitled to a seat. Therefore, McHugh transferred to Grayndler, forcing McLeay to transfer to Division of Watson which he held until 2004.

McLeay was Chair of Committees and Deputy Speaker of the House of Representatives 1986–89, and Speaker of the House 1989–93. He, Neil Andrew and Bronwyn Bishop are the only three speakers to be subject to motions of no confidence (which were defeated in all cases on party lines). He resigned as Speaker following accusations that he had made a false compensation claim. This accusation was later shown to be incorrect. McLeay was subsequently Chief Government Whip 1993–96 and Chief Opposition Whip 1996–2001. He retired at the 2004 election.

Later career
After leaving parliament Leo McLeay became a Director of the Mary MacKillop Foundation in 2005. He was also the New South Wales director of the Enhance Group.

Personal life
Leo has three sons - Mark, Paul and Marten. Paul McLeay was the Member for Heathcote in the New South Wales Legislative Assembly from 2003 until his defeat at the 2011 state election.

References

External links
 Cartoon by Geoff Pryor appearing in the Canberra Times 20 December 1992 

1945 births
Living people
Australian Labor Party members of the Parliament of Australia
Labor Right politicians
Members of the Australian House of Representatives for Grayndler
Members of the Australian House of Representatives for Watson
Speakers of the Australian House of Representatives
21st-century Australian politicians
20th-century Australian politicians